Flashover Recordings is a trance music record label founded by Dutch trance producer and DJ Ferry Corsten in 2005.

The label was first formed releasing only trance music which included its sub-labels Levare Recordings and Flashover Recordings itself. But in recent years, the label has started to release both trance and house music. The label has 3 new house sublabels, releasing only one style of house on each of the 3 including Flashover Progressive House & Flashover Electro House. In June 2014, Flashover Recordings have announced their new sub-label titled 'Flashover Trance'.

Sublabels
 Aleph Recordings
 Levare Recordings
 Boom Tsjak
 MoodyMoon Recordings
 Flashover Progressive House
 Flashover Electro House
 Flashover House
 Flashback
 Flashover Trance

Artists
Breakfast
Coburn
Dave Walker
FB
Ferry Corsten
Lemon & Einar K
Mason
Mind One
P.A.F.F.
Rafaël Frost
Pierre Pienaar
DIM3NSION
Randy Boyer & Eric Tadla
Rockdown
Ronnie Allstar
Tritonal
Yuri Kane
Analogue Sound Department
Purple Stories
 Jacob Van Hage
 Sidone
Kura
 Ryan Sauvage & Erol Montez
 Festen
 Alex Larichev
 Halfway House
 Enzo Darren

See also
 List of record labels

References 

Dutch record labels
Record labels established in 2005
Trance record labels
Electronic dance music record labels